Atlètic Club d'Escaldes, also commonly known as Atlètic d'Escaldes, is an Andorran football club based in Escaldes-Engordany, currently playing in Primera Divisió.

History
Atlètic Club d'Escaldes was founded on 20 May 2002 in Escaldes-Engordany joining Segona Divisió the same year. At the end of 2003–04 season the club was promoted to Primera Divisió. During three seasons the club was playing in the top flight until 2006–07 season when it was relegated to Segona Divisió. The club came back in the top flight in 2019 after winning the 2018–19 Segona Divisió.

L'Atlètic reached the 2021 Copa Constitució final but lost against UE Sant Julià 2-1. Again the club reached the finals the following season winning the 2022 trophy 4-1 against UE Extremenya.

Colours and badge
Blue is the traditional colour of the club. Since their foundation and until 2015 the club wore yellow and blue in horizontal or vertical stripes. The old shield was replaced the same year.

Honours
Segona Divisió:
Winners (2): 2003–04, 2018–19
Copa Constitució:
Winners (1): 2022
Runners-up: 2021

European results 

Notes
 PR: Preliminary round
 QR: Qualifying round
 1Q: First qualifying round
 2Q: Second qualifying round

Players

Current squad

First League history

References

External links
 

Football clubs in Andorra
2002 establishments in Andorra
Association football clubs established in 2002